Thomas Merton Society of Great Britain and Ireland is an association for the study of the life and work of Thomas Merton. It was founded on 12 December 1993.

The Society publishes a journal, The Merton Journal. It also organises conferences and retreats. The Society owns a small collection of books and journals relating to Thomas Merton, these are housed at the Catholic National Library in Farnborough, Hampshire.

It is affiliated with the International Thomas Merton Society which is based in Louisville, Kentucky.

External links
Thomas Merton Society of Great Britain and Ireland Official site.

1993 establishments in the United Kingdom
Learned societies of the United Kingdom
Organizations established in 1993